(born September 5, 1977) is a Japanese professional wrestler who works as a freelancer. He is known for working at Gatoh Move Pro Wrestling. He is the current Super Asia Champion in his first reign.

Career
Fujita started in Big Japan Pro Wrestling (BJW) as a protégé of its top junior heavyweight, Yoshihiro Tajiri. When Tajiri, who was Big Japan junior heavyweight champion, quit the company and gave up the title, Fujita had a decision match against Katsumi Usuda from the Battlarts promotion but ended up losing.

Fujita spent his time leaving Big Japan to venture into other Japanese independents, meeting Ikuto Hidaka of Battlarts along the way and making memorable tag team matches with him. The combination, however, despite their combined talent, could not have a future due to their separate schedules; Fujita tried a move to Michinoku Pro Wrestling in 2000, but despite the higher exposure, it did little for him financially and did not raise his stock as a viable junior heavyweight contender.

He thus headed for Mexico and Puerto Rico, where he won his first major title, the International Wrestling Association junior heavyweight title. Returning to Japan in 2002, he entered New Japan Pro-Wrestling (to which he had been once before, in a Best of the Super Junior tournament), to challenge the heavyweight division, but nothing came out of it. He then headed to Taka Michinoku's Kaientai Dojo promotion, but despite being promoted as a tough-to beat heel, he was never able to win titles there.

A change of pace came in 2004 when he joined Pro Wrestling Zero-One (Zero-One), where old friend Hidaka awaited. The two began teaming more frequently and this time they clicked, collecting several tag team titles along the way. Their greatest victory came in March 2006, when they defeated Pro Wrestling Noah (Noah) stars Yoshinobu Kanemaru and Takashi Sugiura to win the GHC Junior Heavyweight Tag Team Championship. Since then Fujita has been a rising star in Japan and has finally shed the "underachiever" tag he was saddled with by foreign observers of puroresu.

Fujita defeated Baliyan Akki on the day 2 of the 100th Anniversary of Chocopro on March 28, 2021 to win the Super Asia Championship.

Championships and accomplishments 

 Big Japan Pro Wrestling
 BJW Deathmatch Heavyweight Championship (1 time)
 UWA World Trios Championship (1 time, current) – with Isami Kodaka and Daiki Shimomura
 DDT Pro-Wrestling
 Ironman Heavymetalweight Championship (1 time)
 KO-D 6 Man Tag Team Championship (1 time) – with Daisuke Sasaki and MJ Paul
 KO-D Tag Team Championship (1 time) – with Harashima
 UWA World Trios Championship (2 times) – with Mazada and Nosawa Rongai
 Gatoh Move Pro Wrestling
 Super Asia Championship (1 time)
 International Wrestling Association
 IWA World Junior Heavyweight Championship (1 time)
 UWA World Junior Heavyweight Championship (1 time)
 Kohaku Wrestling Wars
 UWA World Tag Team Championship (1 time) – with Masamune
 Michinoku Pro Wrestling
 Tohoku Tag Team Championship (1 time) – with Ikuto Hidaka
 UWA World Tag Team Championship (1 time) – with Ikuto Hidaka
 Premier Wrestling Federation
 PWF Unified Tag Team Championship (1 time) – with Ikuto Hidaka
 Pro Wrestling Freedoms
 King of Freedom World Tag Team Championship (2 times) – with Kenji Fukimoto (1) and Rina Yamashita (1)
 Pro Wrestling Illustrated
 Ranked No. 81 of the 500 best singles wrestlers in the PWI 500 in 2006
 Pro Wrestling Noah
 GHC Junior Heavyweight Tag Team Championship (1 time) – with Ikuto Hidaka
 Pro Wrestling Zero1
 AWA World Junior Heavyweight Championship (1 time)
 NWA Intercontinental Tag Team Championship (2 times) – with Ikuto Hidaka (1) and Takuya Sugawara (1)
 NWA International Lightweight Tag Team Championship (2 times) – with Ikuto Hidaka (1) and Takuya Sugawara (1)
 WDB Tag Team Championship (1 time) – with Saki Maemura
 Passion Cup Tag Tournament (2007)
 Tenkaichi Jr. (2006)
 Tokyo Gurentai
 Tokyo Intercontinental Tag Team Championship (1 time) – with Mazada
 Tokyo World Heavyweight Championship (2 time, current)
 Tokyo Sports
 Best Tag Team Award (2005) with Ikuto Hidaka
 Wrestle-1
 UWA World Trios Championship (1 time) – with Mazada and Nosawa Rongai

References

External links
 ZERO1 USA English language website
 ZERO1 Japanese language website

1977 births
Japanese male professional wrestlers
Living people
GHC Junior Heavyweight Tag Team Champions
UWA World Trios Champions
20th-century professional wrestlers
21st-century professional wrestlers
Tohoku Tag Team Champions
UWA World Tag Team Champions
KO-D 6-Man Tag Team Champions
KO-D Tag Team Champions
UWA World Junior Heavyweight Champions
BJW Deathmatch Heavyweight Champions
Yokohama Shopping Street 6-Man Tag Team Champions